Renzo Vestrini (22 May 1906 – 29 October 1976) was an Italian rower. He competed at the 1928 Summer Olympics in Amsterdam with the men's coxed pair where they did not finish in the quarter final. Two brothers, Pier Luigi Vestrini and Roberto Vestrini, were also Olympic rowers.

References

1906 births
1976 deaths
Italian male rowers
Olympic rowers of Italy
Rowers at the 1928 Summer Olympics
Sportspeople from Florence
European Rowing Championships medalists
Italian emigrants to Venezuela